Wild banana may refer to:
 Musa acuminata, wild ancestor of the domestic banana plants
 Musa balbisiana, the domestic banana and true plantain plants

See also
 Wild type